J.-Eugène Tétreault (28 September 1884 – 24 December 1944) was a Conservative member of the House of Commons of Canada. He was born in Saint-Valérien, Quebec and became a merchant, notably the president of N. Mitchell Company and a director of Dominion Automatic Gate Company Ltd.

He was first elected to Parliament at the Shefford riding in the 1930 general election and served only one term in the House of Commons. Tétreault did not seek re-election in 1935.

References

External links
 

1884 births
1944 deaths
Canadian merchants
Conservative Party of Canada (1867–1942) MPs
Members of the House of Commons of Canada from Quebec